
Male bra – also known as a compression bra, compression vest, or gynecomastia vest – refers to brassieres that are worn by men. Men sometimes develop breasts and the estimates of those with the condition are presented as a range "because the definition of gynecomastia varies and the method of surveying varies." Although there are options for treating gynecomastia, some elect surgery to reduce their breasts or wear a male bra. Male bras typically flatten rather than lift.

Men who choose to wear a brassiere may broadly be divided into two categories, depending on whether the brassiere is worn primarily for utilitarian purposes, or as a part of cross-dressing. Some men who have large breasts as a result of obesity or gynecomastia may choose to wear a brassiere to provide support for their breasts and to flatten their appearance. Other men wear bras for cross-dressing, for sexual purposes such as transvestic fetishism or feminization, or as a form of submission to their partner. Petticoat discipline may also involve male bra wear. Additionally, some male athletes – more specifically runners – may choose to wear a sports bra under their shirts in order to prevent a common medical condition called jogger's nipple, also known as nipple chafing. This condition is caused by excessive rubbing of wet sweat-soaked material over one's nipples. The condition, often very painful, can be prevented by wearing a sports bra.

Although some bras for men have been developed, they often differ only superficially from their female counterparts. There is sometimes no medical necessity for men to wear bras, and the same considerations for and against apply regardless of gender.

In sport, a male bra is often used by sporting clubs to evaluate players with real-time statistics.  It contains a tracking device (similar to a woman's sports bra with a heart rate monitor) that detects heart rate, distance traveled, fatigue, and other statistics that a coach can use to evaluate a player.

In popular culture
An episode of the TV sitcom Seinfeld, titled "The Doorman", has the character Kramer invent a male bra for Frank Costanza, who has large breasts. They disagree on the name, with Kramer wanting to call it a "bro" and Frank preferring "manssiere", a play on the term "brassiere".
An episode of the American animated television sitcom Napoleon Dynamite titled "FFA", featured Napoleon revealing that he is wearing a "men's action bra" in a cutaway in which he competes in a "speed milking" contest.

See also 
 Breast fetishism
 Breast binding
 Breast reduction
 Growth hormone treatment for bodybuilding
 Klinefelter syndrome

References

Brassieres
Undergarments